was a town located in the Higashimatsuura District of Saga Prefecture, Japan.

As of 2003, the town had an estimated population of 5,895 and a density of 809.75 persons per km². The total area was 7.28 km².

On January 1, 2005, Yobuko, along with the towns of Chinzei, Hamatama, Hizen, Kyūragi and Ōchi, and the village of Kitahata (all from Higashimatsuura District), was merged into the expanded city of Karatsu.

Yobuko is famed for its fresh squid, ika (烏賊) in Japanese, which is offered sashimi style, or it can be eaten while the squid is still alive.  Yobuko also attracts local tourists, who come to see the Yobuko Big Bridge (呼子大橋).

Yobuko has a festival known as Yobuko Ouzunabi (呼子大綱引), or the Yobuko big rope pull, which takes place annually on the first Saturday and Sunday of June.  The event involves a big tug-o-war between two factions in the town, and local legend says that if the hills faction wins, there will be a good harvest that year; and if the sea faction wins, there will be a good fishing harvest that year.

References
 Yokubo History (呼子町史) 1978 
 Yokubo History 2005 by ふるさと呼子

External links
Tourist information
Nanatsugama caves

Dissolved municipalities of Saga Prefecture